Vitis nesbittiana is a species of liana in the grape family. It is native to central Mexico (Veracruz).

References

nesbittiana
Plants described in 1987
Flora of Mexico